The Priory is a play by Michael Wynne that opened at the downstairs theatre of the Royal Court Theatre in London in 2009. The production starred Jessica Hynes, Rupert Penry-Jones, Charlotte Riley, Alastair Mackenzie, Joseph Millson and Rachael Stirling. After receiving good reviews, its run was extended.  Michael Wynne won the Olivier Award for 'Best New Comedy' for The Priory. Stirling was nominated for a Laurence Olivier Award for Best Performance in a Supporting Role for her role as Rebecca.

Synopsis
Following her split from her boyfriend, Kate decides to invite a group of her closest friends to a renovated and supposedly haunted priory, for a New Year's Eve party. However, as the drinks and drugs start to flow, personal revelations begin to emerge leading to near tragedy and a fraught morning after.

Characters
 Kate: a budding author who has suffered personal tragedy throughout the previous year and is looking forward to a better one. 
Daniel: a gay architect who surfs the internet looking for love.
 Carl: a "resting" actor, best known for a coffee commercial, now happily working in a garden centre and Kate's college boyfriend.
 Rebecca: Carl's BAFTA award winning wife and obsessive mother of his two small children.
 Ben: an award winning travel writer.
 Laura: a counter girl at Harvey Nichols and Ben's fiancé of one day, the pair having met the night before.

Original production
The premiere of the play was at the Royal Court Theatre in London. It was directed by Jeremy Herrin and starred Jessica Hynes as Kate, Joseph Millson as Daniel, Rupert Penry-Jones as Carl, Rachael Stirling as Rebecca, Alastair Mackenzie as Ben and Charlotte Riley as Laura.

"...Wynnes sharp, funny writing and Jeremy Herrins exceptionally well acted production ensure total authenticity so that by the end the play feels positively radical in this main stage bastion of the cutting edge... His (Michael Wynne's) control of situation and character is impressively mature..." - Michael Coveney WHATS ON STAGE

"...It is a perceptive piece, laced with Wynne’s customary wit and insight. And it has serious points to make about success, failure, peer pressure and loneliness..." - Sarah Hemming FINANCIAL TIMES

References

2009 plays
English plays